Logging is the process of cutting, processing, and moving trees to a location for transport.  It may include skidding, on-site processing, and loading of trees or logs onto trucks or skeleton cars. In forestry, the term logging is sometimes used narrowly to describe the logistics of moving wood from the stump to somewhere outside the forest, usually a sawmill or a lumber yard. In common usage, however, the term may cover a range of forestry or silviculture activities.

Logging is the beginning of a supply chain that provides raw material for many products societies worldwide use for housing, construction, energy, and consumer paper products. Logging systems are also used to manage forests, reduce the risk of wildfires, and restore ecosystem functions, though their efficiency for these purposes has been challenged.

Logging frequently has negative impacts. Illegal logging refers to the harvesting, transportation, purchase, or sale of timber in violation of laws. The harvesting procedure itself may be illegal, including the use of corrupt means to gain access to forests; extraction without permission or from a protected area; the cutting of protected species; or the extraction of timber in excess of agreed limits. It may involve the so-called "timber mafia". Excess logging can lead to irreparable harm to ecosystems, such as deforestation and biodiversity loss. Infrastructure for logging can also lead to other environmental degradation. These negative environmental impacts can lead to environmental conflict. Additionally, there is significant occupational injury risk involved in logging.

Logging can take many formats. Clearcutting (or "block cutting") is not necessarily considered a type of logging but a harvesting or silviculture method. Cutting trees with the highest value and leaving those with lower value, often diseased or malformed trees, is referred to as high grading. It is sometimes called selective logging, and confused with selection cutting, the practice of managing stands by harvesting a proportion of trees. Logging usually refers to above-ground forestry logging. Submerged forests exist on land that has been flooded by damming to create reservoirs. Harvesting trees from forests submerged by flooding or dam creation is called underwater logging, a form of timber recovery.

Clearcutting

Clearcutting, or clearfelling, is a method of harvesting that removes essentially all the standing trees in a selected area. Depending on management objectives, a clearcut may or may not have reserve trees left to attain goals other than regeneration, including wildlife habitat management, mitigation of potential erosion or water quality concerns. Silviculture objectives for clearcutting, (for example, healthy regeneration of new trees on the site) and a focus on forestry distinguish it from deforestation. Other methods include shelterwood cutting, group selective, single selective, seed-tree cutting, patch cut, and retention cutting.

Logging methods

The above operations can be carried out by different methods, of which the following three are considered industrial methods:

/ stem-only harvesting 
Trees are felled and then delimbed and topped at the stump. The log is then transported to the landing, where it is bucked and loaded on a truck. This leaves the slash (and the nutrients it contains) in the cut area, where it must be further treated if wild land fires are of concern.

Whole-tree logging

Trees and plants are felled and transported to the roadside with top and limbs intact. There have been advancements to the process which now allows a logger or harvester to cut the tree down, top, and delimb a tree in the same process. This ability is due to the advancement in the style felling head that can be used. The trees are then delimbed, topped, and bucked at the landing. This method requires that slash be treated at the landing. In areas with access to cogeneration facilities, the slash can be chipped and used for the production of electricity or heat. Full-tree harvesting also refers to utilization of the entire tree including branches and tops. This technique removes both nutrients and soil cover from the site and so can be harmful to the long-term health of the area if no further action is taken, however, depending on the species, many of the limbs are often broken off in handling so the end result may not be as different from tree-length logging as it might seem.

Cut-to-length logging

Cut-to-length logging is the process of felling, delimbing, bucking, and sorting (pulpwood, sawlog, etc.) at the stump area, leaving limbs and tops in the forest. Mechanical harvesters fell the tree, delimb, and buck it, and place the resulting logs in bunks to be brought to the landing by a skidder or forwarder.

Transporting logs

Felled logs are then generally transported to a sawmill to be cut into lumber, to a paper mill for paper pulp, or for other uses, for example, as fence posts. Many methods have been used to move logs from where they were cut to a rail line or directly to a sawmill or paper mill. The cheapest and historically most common method is making use of a river's current to float floating tree trunks downstream, by either log driving or timber rafting. (Some logs sink because of high resin content; these are called deadheads.) In the late 1800s and the first half of the 1900s, the most common method was the high-wheel loader, which was a set of wheels over ten feet tall that the log or logs were strapped beneath. Oxen were at first used with the high-wheel loaders, but in the 1930s tractors replaced the oxen. In 1960 the largest high wheel loader was built for service in California. Log transportation can be challenging and costly since trees are often far from roads or watercourses. Road building and maintenance may be restricted in National Forests or other wilderness areas since it can cause erosion in riparian zones. When felled logs sit adjacent to a road, heavy machinery may simply lift logs onto trucks. Most often, special heavy equipment is used to gather the logs from the site and move them close to the road to be lifted on trucks. Many methods exist to transport felled logs lying away from roads. Cable logging involves a yarder, which pulls one or several logs along the ground to a platform where a truck is waiting. When the terrain is too uneven to pull logs on the ground, a skyline can lift logs off the ground vertically, similar to a ski lift. Heli-logging, which uses heavy-lift helicopters to remove cut trees from forests by lifting them on cables attached to a helicopter, may be used when cable logging is not allowed for environmental reasons or when roads are lacking. It reduces the level of infrastructure required to log in a specific location, reducing the environmental impact of logging. Less mainstream or now for the most part superseded forms of log transport include horse logging and the use of oxen, or balloon logging.

Safety considerations
Logging is a dangerous occupation. In the United States, it has consistently been one of the most hazardous industries and was recognized by the National Institute for Occupational Safety and Health (NIOSH) as a priority industry sector in the National Occupational Research Agenda (NORA) to identify and provide intervention strategies regarding occupational health and safety issues.

In 2008, the logging industry employed 86,000 workers and accounted for 93 deaths. This resulted in a fatality rate of 108.1 deaths per 100,000 workers that year. This rate is over 30 times higher than the overall fatality rate. Forestry/logging-related injuries (fatal and non-fatal) are often difficult to track through formal reporting mechanisms. Thus, some programs have begun to monitor injuries through publicly available reports such as news media.  The logging industry experiences the highest fatality rate of 23.2 per 100,000 full-time equivalent (FTE) workers and a non-fatal incident rate of 8.5 per 100 FTE workers. The most common type of injuries or illnesses at work include musculoskeletal disorders (MSDs), which include an extensive list of "inflammatory and degenerative conditions affecting the muscles, tendons, ligaments, joints, peripheral nerves, and supporting blood vessels."  Loggers work with heavy, moving weights, and use tools such as chainsaws and heavy equipment on uneven and sometimes steep or unstable terrain. Loggers also deal with severe environmental conditions, such as inclement weather and severe heat or cold. An injured logger is often far from professional emergency treatment.

Traditionally, the cry of "Timber!" developed as a warning alerting fellow workers in an area that a tree is being felled, so they should be alert to avoid being struck. The term "widowmaker" for timber that is neither standing nor fallen to the ground demonstrates another emphasis on situational awareness as a safety principle.

In British Columbia, Canada, the BC Forest Safety Council was created in September 2004 as a not-for-profit society dedicated to promoting safety in the forest sector. It works with employers, workers, contractors, and government agencies to implement fundamental changes necessary to make it safer to earn a living in forestry.

The risks experienced in logging operations can be somewhat reduced, where conditions permit, by the use of mechanical tree harvesters, skidders, and forwarders.

See also

Ark (river boat)
Cable logging, Skyline logging
Deforestation
Deforestation and climate change
Forest railway or logging railroad
Logging road
Heli-logging
Log driving
Log scaler
Lumberjack
Lumberjack World Championship
World Logging Championship
logging camp
Logging in the Sierra Nevada
Michigan logging wheels
Salvage logging
Shovel logging
Silviculture
Timber rafting
Benson raft
Wood industry
Wood economy
World Forestry Congress

References

Further reading

External links

 National Institute for Occupational Safety and Health – Logging safety
 Publications on timber harvesting in Minnesota, US. Many are applicable elsewhere.
 EIA forest reports: Investigations into illegal logging.
 EIA in the USA Reports and info.
 Logging in Reynoldston, NY 1870–1930, northern foothills of the Adirondack Mountains
 Life in Logging Camps in Reynoldston NY 1870–1930
 BC Forest Safety Council
 Pictorial history of logging from 1880–1920
 Naturally:wood Sustainable Forest Management
 Logging in North Vancouver in the 1910s – A visual history from the UBC Library Digital Collections
 Industries and Occupation Photographs in the Pacific Northwest – Logging and Lumber Mining Photographs from the University of Washington Library
 Kinsey Brothers Photography of the Lumber Industry in the Pacific Northwest – University of Washington Library
 Man to Machine: Logging in the Pacific Northwest – University of Washington Library
 North American forest industry  online information portal

 
Forestry occupations